Aglaia odoratissima is a species of plant in the family Meliaceae. It is found in Brunei, India, Indonesia, Malaysia, Myanmar, the Philippines, Singapore, and Thailand.

References

odoratissima
Least concern plants
Taxonomy articles created by Polbot